Toshiharu is a masculine Japanese given name.

Possible writings
Toshiharu can be written using different combinations of kanji characters. Some examples:

敏治, "agile, to manage"
敏春, "agile, spring"
敏温, "agile, warm up"
敏晴, "agile, clear (weather)"
俊治, "talented, to manage"
俊春, "talented, spring"
俊温, "talented, warm up"
俊晴, "talented, clear (weather)"
利治, "benefit, to manage"
利春, "benefit, spring"
利温, "benefit, warm up"
利晴, "benefit, clear (weather)"
年治, "year, to manage"
年春, "year, spring"
寿治, "long life, to manage"
寿春, "long life, spring"

The name can also be written in hiragana としはる or katakana トシハル.

Notable people with the name
Toshiharu Furukawa (古川 俊治, born 1963), Japanese medical doctor, attorney, and politician of the Liberal Democratic Party.
Toshiharu Ikeda (池田 敏春, 1951 – 2010), Japanese film director and screenwriter.
Toshiharu Kokubun (國分 利治, born 1958), CEO and founder of Earth Holdings.
Toshiharu Sakurai (桜井 敏治, born 1964), Japanese voice actor.
Toshiharu Todoroki (轟木 利治, born 1960), Japanese politician of the Democratic Party of Japan.

Fictional characters
Toshiharu Shibahime (芝姫 俊春), from manga and anime Kareshi Kanojo no Jijo.

See also
10319 Toshiharu, main-belt asteroid

Japanese masculine given names